Daniel A. Barber is Professor of Architecture at the University of Technology Sydney (UTS) and a Research Affiliate at the Max Planck Institute for the History of Science in Berlin. Daniel has held academic positions and fellowships at Harvard University, the University of Pennsylvania, Princeton University, and Yale University, and at the Instituto Universitário de Lisboa, the Rachel Carson Center for Environment and Society and most recently as a Senior Research Fellow at the Centre for Apocalyptic and Post-Apocalyptic Studies (CAPAS) at the Universität Heidelberg. He was awarded the Guggenheim Fellowship in 2022-3.

Education
He holds a PhD in Architecture (History and Theory) from Columbia University, granted by the Graduate School of Architecture Planning and Preservation (GSAPP) and the Graduate School of Arts and Sciences (GSAS).  He also holds a Master of Environmental Design (MED) from Yale School of Architecture. He received his MFA Studio Arts from Mills College in Oakland, California and his BA in Comparative History of Ideas from the University of Washington, Seattle.

Scholarship and research

His research and teaching focus on how the practice and pedagogy are changing to address the climate emergency. As a 2022–2023 Guggenheim Fellow, he is working on the project Thermal Practices.

His most recent book is Modern Architecture and Climate: Design before Air Conditioning (Princeton University Press, 2020), following on A House in the Sun: Modern Architecture and Solar Energy in the Cold War (Oxford University Press, 2016). His essay “After Comfort” (Log 49, 2019) has been translated into three languages; it forms the basis for an exhibition at the 2023 COP meeting in Dubai, and for a forthcoming series of essays and projects on the e-flux architecture online platform. Daniel lectures internationally, including a recent talk at the International Architecture Biennale Rotterdam, and the keynote "Architecture in the Overshoot" to close the exhibition Anthropocene at the Narodowy Instytut Architektury I Urbanistyki, Warsaw, Poland. Daniel is increasingly focused on amplifying the climate-relevant work of scholars and practitioners, and on developing concepts and frameworks for architects, policymakers, developers, and others to engage the climate emergency. He is co-founder of the Current: Collective on Environment and Architectural History, and co-editor of the annual Accumulation series on e-flux architecture, now also in a print volume. He recently co-edited a special issue of Future Anterior focused on preservation and retrofit, and is part of the Cohabitations editorial collective, supporting interdisciplinary and multi-sited research on climate, displacement, and design.

Awards
 Guggenheim Fellow, 2022-3

Publications
 Barber, Daniel A.  Modern Architecture and Climate: Design Before Air Conditioning. Princeton: Princeton University Press, 2020. 
 Barber, Daniel A. A House in the Sun: Modern Architecture and Solar Energy in the Cold War. Oxford: Oxford University Press, 2016. 
 Willis, Daniel, William W. Braham, Katsuhiko Muramoto, and Daniel A. Barber, eds. Energy Accounts: Architectural Representations of Energy, Climate, and the Future. London ; New York: Routledge, Taylor & Francis Group, 2017. 
 Barber, Daniel A., Kevin Bone, Steven Hillyer, and Sunnie Joh, eds. Lessons from Modernism: Environmental Design Strategies in Architecture, 1925–1970. New York: The Cooper Union Institute for Sustainable Design, The Irwin S. Chanin School of Architecture of The Cooper Union : The Monacelli Press, 2014.

References

Living people
American architectural historians
American male non-fiction writers
Lists of Guggenheim Fellowships
Academic staff of the University of Technology Sydney
Columbia Graduate School of Architecture, Planning and Preservation alumni
Yale School of Architecture alumni
Year of birth missing (living people)